Thomas Egerton was a bookseller and publisher in Whitehall, London ca.1750–1830. With business partner John Egerton he took over the enterprise established by John Millan. For some years Egerton's office stood on Charing Cross. Books published included works by Jane Austen.

Thomas Egerton died on 26 August 1830, in his 81st year, described as "of Whitehall".

John Egerton married Mary Davis, daughter of bookseller Lockyer John Davis, on 11 October 1783 in Westminster. He died in January 1795.

Works Published by John and Thomas Egerton

References

External links
 WorldCat. Thomas Egerton
 WorldCat. John Egerton (his business partner, died in 1795)
 Open Library. Fulltext works published by T. Egerton, various dates
 Label of Thomas Egerton, bookseller at 32 Charing Cross, London. Dated 1781
 Egerton, T, Bookseller, 32, Charing-cross, Post Office Annual Directory, 1808, p93

Publishers (people) from London
English booksellers